The following events occurred in March 1937:

March 1, 1937 (Monday)
Kyösti Kallio became 4th President of Finland.
The Camp of National Unity was founded in Poland.
The government of Manchukuo passed a law on royal succession making Puyi's brother Pujie the next in line for the throne. Puyi had been married for fourteen years but did not have any children.
The French steamer Marie-Thérèse le Borgne hit a naval mine in the same area where the British ship Llandovery Castle was damaged a week previously. The ship was able to make port at Palamós.
Died: DeWitt Jennings, 65, American actor

March 2, 1937 (Tuesday)
British Parliament endorsed the government's rearmament program by a vote of 243 to 134. Italy replied by ordering every male in the country between 18 and 55 to be fit for "integral militarization".
Cecilia Colledge of the United Kingdom won the ladies' competition of the World Figure Skating Championships in London.
Mexican President Lázaro Cárdenas announced that the government would take over control of the country's oil resources.
The Frank Capra-directed drama-fantasy film Lost Horizon starring Ronald Colman was released.
Born: Abdelaziz Bouteflika, 5th President of Algeria, in Oujda, French Morocco

March 3, 1937 (Wednesday)
The Holmes Foundry Riot occurred in Sarnia, Ontario, Canada. Workers engaging in a sitdown strike were attacked by nonstriking employees who wanted to go back to work. 50 people were injured, including 9 who were hospitalized.
New York City Mayor Fiorello H. La Guardia made a speech to a Jewish women's group proposing that the 1939 World's Fair include a "Hall of Horrors" with a figure of "that brown-shirted fanatic who is now menacing the peace of the world."
Born: Bobby Driscoll, child actor, in Cedar Rapids, Iowa (d. 1968)

March 4, 1937 (Thursday)
Der Angriff dedicated its entire front page to attacking Fiorello La Guardia, calling him a "scoundrel" and an "impudent Jew" who governed New York with "the terror of the revolvers and clubs of his gangster friends." The German government directed its ambassador to Washington Hans Luther to make a formal protest against La Guardia's remarks.
The 9th Academy Awards were held in Los Angeles. The Great Ziegfeld won for Best Picture.
Born: Graham Dowling, cricketer, in Christchurch, New Zealand; Leslie H. Gelb, political scientist and newspaper columnist, in New Rochelle, New York (d. 2019); Yuri Senkevich, Mongolian-born Soviet doctor and scientist, in Choibalsan (d. 2003); Barney Wilen, jazz saxophonist, in Nice, France (d. 1996)

March 5, 1937 (Friday)
The Battle of Cape Machichaco was fought, resulting in a Nationalist victory.
The Communist Party of Spain demanded that POUM be eliminated.
The Hungarian government revealed a plot by the National Socialist Party and arrested its leader Ferenc Szálasi.
The U.S. Department of State officially apologized to the German government for Fiorello La Guardia's remarks.
Born: Olusegun Obasanjo, President of Nigeria, in Abeokuta, Colonial Nigeria

March 6, 1937 (Saturday)
The Battle of Pozoblanco began.
A two-question referendum was held in Australia. Neither proposal to alter the Australian Constitution was carried.
The Belgian student association "Academicus Sancti Michaëlis Ordo" was founded.
Born: Valentina Tereshkova, cosmonaut and first woman in space, in Bolshoye Maslennikovo, Yaroslavl Oblast, USSR

March 7, 1937 (Sunday)
Parliamentary elections were held in Chile. The Liberal Party won a slim plurality in the Senate and tied with the Conservative Party in the Chamber of Deputies.
The Percy Grainger composition Lincolnshire Posy was first performed in Milwaukee, Wisconsin.

March 8, 1937 (Monday)
The Battle of Guadalajara began.
The steamship Mar Cantabrico, carrying war materiel from the United States to the Spanish Republic, was intercepted in the Bay of Biscay by the Nationalists who shot 26 members of the crew. 
The title of Duke of Windsor was created for the former king Edward.
Born: Juvénal Habyarimana, 3rd President of Rwanda, in Ruanda-Urundi (d. 1994)
Died: Howie Morenz, 34, Canadian ice hockey player (coronary embolism)

March 9, 1937 (Tuesday)
Heinrich Himmler ordered the arrest of "professional criminals" who had committed two or more crimes but were now free after serving their sentences. Over the next few days some 2,000 people were arrested without charges and sent to concentration camps.
President Roosevelt gave a fireside chat on his judicial reform bill.
Born: Harry Neale, ice hockey coach and commentator, in Sarnia, Ontario, Canada
Died: Paul Elmer More, 72, American journalist, essayist and Christian apologist

March 10, 1937 (Wednesday)
Pope Pius XI issued the encyclical Mit brennender Sorge, condemning breaches of the Reichskonkordat by the Nazi regime in Germany.
German and Italian POWs who fought for the Nationalists in the Spanish Civil War were interviewed in Valencia by a correspondent of the British newspaper The Times. The captured fighters confirmed they were regular soldiers of their country's army and not civilian volunteers.
Benito Mussolini sailed for Libya to conduct an inspection tour and review the Italian fleet.
Jersey Airport opened in the Channel Islands.

March 11, 1937 (Thursday)
The funeral of Howie Morenz was held in the Montreal Forum.
Died: Joseph S. Cullinan, 76, American oil industrialist and founder of Texaco

March 12, 1937 (Friday)
Aimo Cajander became Prime Minister of Finland for the third time.
The U.S. Ambassador to Germany William Dodd protested to German Foreign Minister Konstantin von Neurath about recent attacks on the United States in the German press. Von Neurath said he regretted the violent tone of the articles but did not give a formal reply.
Died: Charles-Marie Widor, 93, French organist, composer and teacher

March 13, 1937 (Saturday)
The National Labor Relations Board issued a ruling in the Remington Rand strike, finding that Remington Rand committed acts of deceit, economic warfare and union breaking. The company was ordered to reinstate all strikers with back pay and recognize the union, but owner James Rand, Jr. refused and the strike continued.
One of the few tank-vs.-tank engagements of the Spanish Civil War was fought near Trijueque when some Republican T-26s destroyed five Italian-made CV 3/35 tankettes and severely damaged two more.
Died: Elihu Thomson, 83, English engineer and inventor

March 14, 1937 (Sunday)
Beginning at midnight the naval powers of France, Great Britain, Italy and Germany began patrolling Spanish seas with the objective of keeping foreign arms and volunteers out of the Civil War.

March 15, 1937 (Monday)
20,000 people attended an anti-Nazi rally in Madison Square Garden. Banners hanging from the rafters called for a boycott of Nazi goods. Hugh S. Johnson was a featured speaker at the event, declaring that "Hitler and his immediate staff of Nazipathics have become a sort of monster, threatening the peace of the world."
Died: H. P. Lovecraft, 46, American weird fiction author (intestinal cancer)

March 16, 1937 (Tuesday)
The Corpo Truppe Volontarie was routed during the Battle of Guadalajara.
The Civil List of George VI was presented in the House of Commons. Edward, Duke of Windsor was absent from the list, ending the speculation over whether he would receive a government pension. Whatever income Edward was to receive would be a matter purely within the family.

March 17, 1937 (Wednesday)
The former French ambassador to Italy Charles de Chambrun was shot in the thigh by a woman who blamed him for breaking up her friendship with Mussolini.
Born: Frank Calabrese, Sr., mobster, in Chicago (d. 2012)
Died: Austen Chamberlain, 73, British statesman and Nobel laureate

March 18, 1937 (Thursday)
New London School explosion: A natural gas explosion destroyed a school in New London, Texas and killed at least 295 people. It remains the worst school disaster in American history.
Arabs in Tripoli presented Mussolini with the "Sword of Islam" to symbolize his leadership and present him as a protector of the Muslim faith. A famous propaganda photo depicts Mussolini on horseback raising this sword above his head. 
Republicans took Brihuega.

March 19, 1937 (Friday)
Pope Pius XI promulgated the anti-communist encyclical Divini Redemptoris. 
Royal Mail won the Grand National horse race.

March 20, 1937 (Saturday)
Lou Gehrig signed a new contract with the New York Yankees for $36,000 plus a $750 signing bonus, making him the highest-paid player in baseball.
Amelia Earhart's plane crashed and burst into flames as she attempted to take off in Honolulu. Earhart and her two passengers escaped injury.
Born: Jerry Reed, country musician and actor, in Atlanta (d. 2008)
Died: Harry Vardon, 66, English golfer

March 21, 1937 (Sunday)
The Ponce massacre occurred in Ponce, Puerto Rico when police opened fire on a peaceful civilian march. 21 were killed and more than 200 wounded.
Mit brennender Sorge was read out from the pulpits of German Catholic churches. Copies of the encyclical had to be secretly smuggled into the country.

March 22, 1937 (Monday)
The only acknowledgement of Mit brennender Sorge in the German press appeared in the Völkischer Beobachter, where an editorial said that "even an agreement with the Holy See has not sacrosanct, untouchable and eternal value."
Born: Armin Hary, athlete, in Quierschied, Germany
Died: Alfred Dyke Acland, 78, British Army officer; Mary Russell, Duchess of Bedford, 71, English aviator and ornithologist (plane crash)

March 23, 1937 (Tuesday)
The Battle of Guadalajara ended in a Republican victory. 
Born: Craig Breedlove, race car driver, in Los Angeles

March 24, 1937 (Wednesday)
60,000 auto workers striking against Chrysler ended a 17-day work stoppage after a tentative settlement was reached.
Social Credit backbenchers' revolt: By a vote of 27 to 25, a motion was carried in the Alberta legislature over the protest of Premier William Aberhart to adjourn the debate on his government's budget.
Oxford won the 89th Boat Race, ending Cambridge's streak of 13 consecutive wins.
The romantic drama film Seventh Heaven starring Simone Simon and James Stewart premiered at Grauman's Chinese Theatre in Hollywood.

March 25, 1937 (Thursday)
Italy and Yugoslavia signed a five-year non-aggression and neutrality pact. Yugoslavia recognized Ethiopia as Italian territory while Italy made trade concessions and granted language and school rights for its Yugoslav minority.
TWA Flight 15A crash: A Trans Continental & Western Air passenger plane in Clifton, Pennsylvania crashed attempting to land, killing all 13 aboard.
The Lewiston–Auburn shoe strike began in Maine.

March 26, 1937 (Friday)
William H. Hastie was confirmed as judge of the Federal District Court in the Virgin Islands, becoming the first African-American federal magistrate in U.S. history.
Born: Wayne Embry, basketball player, in Springfield, Ohio

March 27, 1937 (Saturday)
A decree by Hermann Göring was published declaring that anyone who owned land suitable for agriculture was obligated to cultivate it. Landowners who did not comply would be forced to lease part or all of their property to an approved expert.
Born: Johnny Copeland, blues musician, in Haynesville, Louisiana (d. 1997)
Died: Henry Kitchener, 2nd Earl Kitchener, 90, British soldier and peer

March 28, 1937 (Sunday)
Pope Pius XI published the encyclical Nos es muy conocida about the religious situation in Mexico.

March 29, 1937 (Monday)
The U.S. Supreme Court decided West Coast Hotel v. Parrish. Justice Owen Roberts made the jurisprudential shift known as the switch in time that saved nine.
The mysterious murder of model Veronica Gedeon in New York City made front-page headlines in the United States.
Born: Billy Carter, businessman, politician and younger brother of Jimmy Carter, in Plains, Georgia (d. 1988)
Died: Karol Szymanowski, 54, Polish composer and pianist; Kim You-jeong, 29, Korean novelist (pulmunory tuberculosis)

March 30, 1937 (Tuesday)
A Nationalist offensive at Almadén was repulsed.
Hitler was reported to have reconciled his feud with Erich Ludendorff going back to the failed 1923 Beer Hall Putsch.
Born: Warren Beatty, actor and filmmaker, in Richmond, Virginia

March 31, 1937 (Wednesday)
The Bombing of Durango by Nationalist forces resulted in the city's destruction.
The Spanish Civil War campaigns known as the War in the North and Biscay Campaign began.
A general election was held in Japan. Rikken Minseitō lost 26 seats but maintained a narrow plurality.

References

1937
1937-03
1937-03